Alejandro "El Negro" Martinuccio (born 16 December 1987 in Buenos Aires) is an Argentine footballer who plays as a striker. He currently plays for Boston River.

Career

Nueva Chicago
Martinuccio made his debut at Club Atlético Nueva Chicago in 2008 and after a remarkable individual performance with his team in the Primera B Metropolitana was transferred to Uruguayan's C.A. Peñarol.

Peñarol

Martinuccio helped Peñarol reach the 2011 Copa Libertadores Finals, in which Peñarol lost to Brazil's Santos. He had thirteen appearances and scored 2 goals in the competition.

Fluminense
After a good display of football in the 2011 Copa Libertadores, Fluminense signed Martinuccio in July 2011.

Villarreal
Martinuccio joined Villarreal in January 2012 in a loan deal. He scored his first goal for Villarreal against Real Zaragoza on March 4.

Cruzeiro
In July 2012, Cruzeiro signed Martinuccio on a one-year loan from Fluminense. He stayed there for another year until mid-2014 and won the 2013 Brazilian Série A and the 2014 Campeonato Mineiro. Although, due to injuries he could never establish himself in the team and returned to Fluminense.

Coritiba
In June 2014 Martinuccio was loaned one more time, on this occasion to another Brazilian club, Coritiba. Once again he struggled with injuries.

Chapecoense
Without playing since November 2014 Chapecoense signed Alejandro on 30 April 2016. Martinuccio failed in medical exams at Ponte Preta before agreeing with Chapecoense. He had a chance to return to football after a series of serious injuries and surgeries on both legs. Because of a new injury, Martinuccio missed the ill-fated team flight which crashed near Medellín, where 71 people died.

Career statistics

Club

Honours
Peñarol
Campeonato Uruguayo: 2009-10

Cruzeiro
Campeonato Brasileiro Série A: 2013
Campeonato Mineiro: 2014

Chapecoense plane crash
On 28 November 2016, many of his current teammates at Chapecoense were involved in a plane crash, which killed most of the squad (17 died instantly after crash and two more a few hours later in hospital at Medellín). Martuniccio was not on the plane as he had been dropped from the team for the first final game against Atlético Nacional for the 2016 Copa Sudamericana, due to an injury.

References

External links

tablesleague.com

1987 births
Living people
Association football forwards
Argentine footballers
Footballers from Buenos Aires
Argentine expatriate footballers
Association football wingers
Nueva Chicago footballers
Peñarol players
Fluminense FC players
Villarreal CF players
Cruzeiro Esporte Clube players
Coritiba Foot Ball Club players
Associação Chapecoense de Futebol players
Avaí FC players
CD Móstoles URJC players
Boston River players
Uruguayan Primera División players
Campeonato Brasileiro Série A players
Campeonato Brasileiro Série B players
Primera B Metropolitana players
Primera Nacional players
La Liga players
Tercera División players
Expatriate footballers in Uruguay
Expatriate footballers in Brazil
Expatriate footballers in Spain
Argentine expatriate sportspeople in Brazil
Argentine expatriate sportspeople in Spain
Argentine expatriate sportspeople in Uruguay